The Municipal Borough of Castleford was a local government district in the West Riding of Yorkshire from 1955 to 1974 around the town of Castleford, covering Airedale, New Fryston, Whitwood, Cutsyke, Glasshoughton and Whitwood. The Castleford Urban District administered the town from 1894 to 1955.

History

Castleford's Local Board of Health was established to run the local affairs of the town in 1851. At this time they met at the offices of George Bradley, which later became the Liberal Club. At a meeting of the board on 28 July 1869, it was resolved that a design for a new coat of arms be adopted and that the Latin phrase Audacter et Sincere (Boldly and Frankly) be adopted as Castleford's motto. The coat of arms features a gold castle and a ford of white and blue waves upon the shield. White roses indicate the West Riding of Yorkshire, a gold Roman eagle represents the fact that the town stands on the site of a Roman station and a miner's safety lamp alludes to the local coal mining industry. On each wing of the eagle is the badge of the Laceys, Earls of Lincoln and Lords of the Honour in which Castleford used to lie.

In 1871 the Board purchased Gilcroft Cottage to use as offices, originally a private residence. The site also contained the fire station and plumbers workshops. When built in the 1850's, it stood in orchards and allotments. It was bounded by Carlton Street to its front and Gill's Croft (now Bradley Street), from which it got its name. Castleford Free Library was added at the side in 1905. The Local Board became an urban district in 1894 as a result of the Local Government Act 1894, which had boundaries drawn tightly around the town centre.

The Urban District Council petitioned unsuccessfully for borough status for several decades. In 1937 Castleford UD expanded by absorbing  of the abolished Methley Urban District (the remaining  went to enlarge Rothwell Urban District), and in 1938 a major boundary extension occurred as Castleford annexed Whitwood Urban District  as well as part of Tadcaster Rural District ( at Allerton Bywater) and part of the abolished Pontefract Rural District ( comprising Glass Houghton and part of Ferry Fryston civil parishes. 

The expansion created the 'largest UDC in Yorkshire'. Castleford's Charter of Incorporation as a borough was granted on 29 March 1955 and the new borough council superseded the old UDC at 12 noon on Monday 23 May 1955. After 1955 it was the third largest non-county borough in Yorkshire.

The Borough Council built Castleford Civic Centre in 1970 as a purpose-built auditorium featuring two large function rooms as well as being an administration base for the Council, with an official opening by the Duchess of Kent on 14 March 1970.

The borough was abolished under the Local Government Act 1972, and created the north-eastern portion of the new Metropolitan Borough of Wakefield in West Yorkshire by a merger with the County Borough of Wakefield, the Ossett and Pontefract municipal boroughs, Horbury, Stanley, Normanton, Featherstone, Knottingley, and Hemsworth urban districts, and Wakefield, Hemsworth and Osgoldcross rural districts.

References

Municipal Borough
Municipal boroughs of England
Districts of England abolished by the Local Government Act 1972